Santo Stefano al Mare is a comune (municipality) in the Province of Imperia in the Italian region Liguria, located about  southwest of Genoa and about  southwest of Imperia.

Santo Stefano al Mare borders the following municipalities: Cipressa, Pompeiana, Riva Ligure, and Terzorio.

Geography
Its strategic placement helps to maintain a mild climate throughout the year, with temperatures rarely reaching the 0° in winter and overcoming the 30° in summer.

Demographic development

References

Cities and towns in Liguria
Populated coastal places in Italy